UYU may refer to:

 Uruguayan peso, the currency of Uruguay
 Uyuni Airport, southwestern Bolivia (IATA code: UYU)
 Uyu River, northern Myanmar